Ache is a Loloish language spoken by the Yi people of south-central Yunnan, China. Ethnologue lists Azhe as an alternate name.

Demographics
Ache is spoken in Shuangbai County (pop. 23,000), Yimen County (pop. 11,100), Eshan County, and Lufeng County.

Classification
Ethnologue classifies Ache as a Southeastern Loloish language, and lists 35,000 speakers as of 2003. Ache has not been analyzed in classifications of Southeastern Loloish by Pelkey (2011) and Lama (2012), and hence remains unclassified within the Loloish branch.

References

 
 

Loloish languages
Languages of China